Unsolved Mysteries is an American mystery documentary television show, created by John Cosgrove and Terry Dunn Meurer. Documenting cold cases and paranormal phenomena, it began as a series of seven specials, presented by Raymond Burr, Karl Malden, and Robert Stack, beginning on NBC on January 20, 1987, becoming a full-fledged series on October 5, 1988, hosted by Stack. After nine seasons on NBC, the series moved to CBS for its 10th season on November 13, 1997. After adding Virginia Madsen as a co-host during season 11 failed to boost slipping ratings, CBS canceled the series after only a two-season, 12-episode run on June 11, 1999. The series was revived by Lifetime in 2000, with season 12 beginning on July 2, 2001. Unsolved Mysteries aired 103 episodes on Lifetime, before ending on September 20, 2002, an end that coincided with Stack's illness and eventual death.

After a six-year absence, the series was resurrected by Spike in 2007, and began airing on October 13, 2008. This new, revived version was hosted by Dennis Farina, who mainly tied together repackaged segments from the original episodes. Farina hosted 175 episodes before the series ended again on April 27, 2010. Cosgrove-Meurer Productions maintains a website for the show, featuring popular accounts and ongoing cold cases (murder or missing persons), with a link to an online form should a viewer have information on an unsolved crime. As of 2017, the show maintains a YouTube page where viewers can submit their own mysteries. If accepted, Unsolved Mysteries posts a video of the viewer describing the mystery. That same year, FilmRise acquired worldwide digital distribution rights to the series and announced its intent to release updated versions of its episodes. These shows are currently streaming on Amazon Prime, Tubi TV, and on its own dedicated channel on Pluto TV in the United States and the United Kingdom. Since February 2017, the Spike episodes have been officially posted on YouTube, split into eight seasons. In July 2017, the series began streaming on Hulu in the United States. Between February and March 2019, FilmRise began posting digitally restored and re-edited episodes, hosted by Stack, on YouTube.

On June 22, 2018, Terror Vision Records released the official soundtrack for the series. In 2017, the show's creators expressed interest in reviving the series. On January 18, 2019, Netflix picked up a reboot of the series which premiered on July 1, 2020. The first season of the reboot was split into two volumes containing six episodes each. In September 2022, Netflix announced that a third volume of new episodes would begin streaming in October 2022.

Overview

Unsolved Mysteries used a documentary format to profile real-life mysteries and featured re-enactments of unsolved crimes, missing persons cases, conspiracy theories and unexplained paranormal phenomena (alien abductions, ghosts, UFOs, and "secret history" theories).

The concept was created in a series of three specials produced by John Cosgrove and Terry-Dunn Meurer, which were pitched to NBC in 1985 and shown in 1986 with the title, "Missing... Have You Seen This Person?" The success of the specials led Cosgrove and Meurer to broaden the series to include mysteries of all kinds.

The pilot of what eventually became Unsolved Mysteries was a special that aired on NBC on January 20, 1987, with Raymond Burr as host/narrator. Throughout the 1987–88 television season, six more specials aired, the first two hosted by Karl Malden and the final four by Robert Stack. Because of the incorporation of paranormal mysteries, NBC News disowned the series when the network aired on NBC and required that a disclaimer aired before each show clarify that it was "not a news broadcast."

In 1988, the show debuted as a weekly program on NBC. Ratings steadily dropped after the 1993–94 season. Until 2002, it was hosted by Stack. In its second season on CBS in 1999, Stack was joined by co-host Virginia Madsen. Episodes released between 1995 and 1997 featured journalist Keely Shaye Smith and television host Lu Hanessian as correspondents in the show's "phone center", where they provided updates on previous stories as information for "special bulletin" segments. A March 14, 1997, episode featured journalist Cathy Scott in the reenactment of rapper Tupac Shakur's 1996 unsolved murder. This broadcast was one week after the murder of Biggie Smalls. In 2002, the series was canceled by Lifetime. In 2008, television network Spike revived the series with Dennis Farina as its host; the Spike revival ended in 2010.

The show was known for its eerie theme song composed by Michael Boyd and Gary Remal Malkin, and for Stack's grim presence and ominous narration. The theme music was changed seven times, in 1993, 1995, 1997, 1999, 2001, 2008, and 2020. The 2020 version of the theme was arranged, performed, and recorded by West Dylan Thordson.

Updates 
Viewers were occasionally given updates on success stories, where suspects were brought to justice and loved ones were reunited.

The show itself has been credited for bringing increased attention to certain cases and thus allowing them to be solved. One episode featured a video of an arsonist filming an unidentified house being burned down while he was giving strange commentary. Once it had been featured on the show, viewers were able to identify the house involved, and two suspects were arrested.

Broadcast history

NBC (1987–1997)
The show first aired on NBC from 1987 to 1997. The pilot episode was hosted by actor Raymond Burr. Karl Malden and Robert Stack were also hired to host further specials.  When the series became a full-fledged television program in 1988, Stack became the full-time host. Unsolved Mysteries was also one of the few prime-time shows of its era to appeal to fans of the supernatural and used effective special effects to enhance tales of the unexplained.
In 1992, NBC aired a short-lived dramatized court show spin-off program called Final Appeal: From the Files of Unsolved Mysteries, also hosted by Stack. The premise of this program was to try to give the unjustly accused a final appeal for help, with the debut episode taking an in-depth look at the Jeffrey MacDonald case. The program was canceled after only a few episodes due to poor ratings.

CBS (1997–1999)
The ratings for Unsolved Mysteries''' had been steadily declining ever since it was moved from its original Wednesday evening timeslot to Friday evenings in the fall of 1994. At the end of the 1996–97 season, it was canceled by NBC. Upon the cancelation from NBC, CBS picked up the series for a tenth season. The first episode aired in November of 1997 as an Unsolved Mysteries special. When CBS canceled its Block Party line-up in the spring of 1998, the network moved the show to its Friday 9:00 pm timeslot. During the show's run on CBS, the series was limited to only six-episode seasons, and was airing only on a sporadic schedule. Reruns aired during the summer of 1998 with heavy promotion of the return of the NFL on CBS with the upcoming 1998 NFL season. When the series returned for its abbreviated 11th season in the spring of 1999, Stack was joined by actress Virginia Madsen for hosting duties in an attempt to boost its female audience. But the effort failed, and CBS canceled the show soon afterwards. Later cable reruns of segments originally narrated by Madsen were re-dubbed with Stack's voice.

Lifetime (2001–2002)
Lifetime Television, which had been airing re-runs of the NBC episodes since the early 1990s, had ordered a two-season run of new episodes which began airing in 2001. Consisting of a mixture of new and old cases, these episodes were produced between 2001 and 2002, and usually aired on weekdays between 11 a.m. and 3 p.m. The program ceased producing new episodes when Stack was diagnosed with prostate cancer in late 2002. He died of heart failure in May 2003.

After Stack's death, old episodes continued to run in syndication on several television networks in the U.S., Canada, and Australia.
During some shows, callers gave tips to the telecenter. When the show was in active production, the Toll Free number was displayed on the bottom of the screen below the title logo at the end of each segment. When the show left active production following Stack's death and went into reruns, the number was removed and replaced with a P.O. box address.

Spike TV (2008–2010)
According to Broadcasting & Cable, in 2007, HBO Distribution announced plans to bring back Unsolved Mysteries when the cable channel Lifetime's contract expired in 2008. The show featured a new set, a new logo, new music, and updates on old cases. In addition, actor Dennis Farina became the new host, as Stack had died five years earlier. The show debuted on Spike on October 13, 2008.

This repackaged series run was criticized by fans for its presentation of past cases only, with no new case segments being produced. The existing segments were also edited to be shorter so the show could be expanded to present five cases in an hour rather than the four of the original series. Because the majority of the cases were now between 20 and 40 years old, the re-edited segments usually did not reference the years in which the events presented originally occurred. When updates for solved cases aired, Dennis Farina's voiceover would refer to cases "in a recent broadcast...", when the case may have already been solved during the show's original run or during the series' hiatus from 2002 onward. Unsolved Mysteries ended its run on Spike on April 27, 2010.

As of November 24, 2020, Oxygen Network airs 12 episode marathons of this version on Tuesdays from Noon ET/11:00 AM CT.

Netflix (2020–present)

A 12-part reboot was announced by Deadline Hollywood on January 18, 2019. The series is being "refreshed" by Stranger Things executive producer Shawn Levy and his company 21 Laps Entertainment along with Cosgrove-Meurer Productions and Netflix. Cosgrove and Meurer are showrunners for the series, with Levy and Josh Barry being executive producers. Robert Wise is a co-executive producer, along with showrunner Dunn Meurer. Each episode focuses on a single mystery. Cosgrove stated that the reboot would be "pure documentary style" and would have no host or narrator; however, an image of longtime host Robert Stack can be seen in the title sequence for each episode as an homage to his impact on the show. The first six episodes of the new season became available to stream starting July 1, 2020. In August 2020, it was reported that 13.7% of subscribers had watched the series over its first month. On September 1, 2021, Netflix formally announced that it had ordered an additional season of the series set to launch in the summer of 2022. On September 6, 2022, Netflix announced a third volume of nine new episodes, billed as a "three-night event", would begin streaming October 18, October 25, November 1, 2022.

Episodes

Spin-offs
 On September 18, 1992, NBC debuted a short-lived 6-episode spin-off series, hosted by Robert Stack himself, titled Final Appeal: From the Files of Unsolved Mysteries.
 In 1993, NBC aired a two-hour primetime movie called Victim of Love: The Shannon Mohr Story.
 On January 23, 1995, NBC aired a two-hour primetime movie called Escape from Terror: The Teresa Stamper Story.
 On April 22, 1996, NBC aired a two-hour primetime movie special titled, From the Files of Unsolved Mysteries: Voice from the Grave.
 On April 28, 1997, NBC aired a new primetime movie called From the Files of Unsolved Mysteries: The Sleepwalker Killing.

Notable actors and celebrities
Famous actors and celebrities have appeared on the show, both as role actors (before finding stardom) and also in episodes where they had a connection with the events being portrayed.

As role actors
In 1992, Unsolved Mysteries filmed in Texas and cast Matthew McConaughey to play a murder victim. This was one of McConaughey's earliest on-screen roles. Cheryl Hines, Stephnie Weir, Bill Moseley, Ned Bellamy, Scott Wilkinson, Daniel Dae Kim, David Ramsey, and Taran Killam also appeared on the program before receiving more notable work in Hollywood. Hill Harper also appeared in an episode about a woman looking for a childhood friend whom she later discovered was indeed her sister.

Connections with episodes
 Comedian Blake Clark was interviewed in the "Comedy Store Ghosts" episode.
 Author James Ellroy appeared in an episode looking for the man who murdered his mother.
 Football player Reggie White appeared in an episode trying to find the arsonists who set fire to his church.
 Musical group New Kids on the Block appear in an episode about the disappearance of the teenager Kari Lynn Nixon; a girl resembling her was seen at one of their concerts. 
 Musician Henry Rollins and actor Dennis Cole both appeared to find the people responsible for the murder of Cole's son, Joe.
 Musician Ron Bushy appeared in a story about the disappearance of fellow Iron Butterfly bandmate, Philip Taylor Kramer.
 Musician Jon Bon Jovi was interviewed about the death of his personal manager's daughter, Katherine Korzilius.

U.S. television ratings and awards
Seasonal rankings (based on average total viewers per episode) of Unsolved Mysteries.

 Note: U.S. network television seasons generally start in late September and end in late May, which coincides with the completion of May sweeps.The figure reflected starting with the 1988–89 season and ending with the 1996–97 season represents the total number of households viewing the program. Starting with the 1997–98 season, the viewing figure is based on total number of viewers.

The original NBC telecast was nominated six times for an Emmy Award for outstanding informational series in 1989–1993 and 1995. The series won the American Society of Composers, Authors, and Publishers Award for Top TV Series twice, in 1992 and 1993; both times, the recipients were Michael Boyd and Gary Malkin for their work on the show's music theme.

 Home media 
First Look Studios released six theme-based DVD sets in Region 1 in 2004/2005. The sets were re-released on June 21, 2005 with a lower suggested retail price. On March 21, 2006, a compilation set called The Best of Unsolved Mysteries was released, which contained selected segments from each of the earlier DVD sets along with some previously unreleased-on-DVD content. A special boxed set featuring the first six sets along with the new content from the Best of collection was also produced.

Soundtrack
In 2018, Terror Vision Records made a deal with program creator John Cosgrove to release the show's official score on vinyl, Unsolved Mysteries: Ghosts/Hauntings/The Unexplained. Two sets on color vinyl were released on June 22, 2018 – the first, a three vinyl set collecting the scores written for each of the show's ghost and missing/wanted segments along with three theme songs; the second, a 34 tracks single vinyl collection featuring the best cuts off the first three vinyl set. Segment cues were taken from the show's original DAT tapes. A second collection entitled Unsolved Mysteries Volume Two: Bizarre Murders/UFOs/The Unknown was released in December 2019.

Podcast
On October 21, 2020, it was announced that Cosgrove/Meurer Productions had struck a deal with Entercom-owned Cadence13 for an official Unsolved Mysteries'' weekly podcast. The podcast is narrated by voice-over artist Steve French.

See also

References

External links
 
 
 

1987 American television series debuts
1997 American television series endings
1997 American television series debuts
1999 American television series endings
2001 American television series debuts
2002 American television series endings
2008 American television series debuts
2010 American television series endings
2020 American television series debuts
1980s American documentary television series
1990s American documentary television series
2000s American documentary television series
2010s American documentary television series
2020s American documentary television series
1980s American mystery television series
1990s American mystery television series
2000s American mystery television series
2010s American mystery television series
2020s American mystery television series
2021 podcast debuts
American television series revived after cancellation
Audio podcasts
CBS original programming
Crime podcasts
English-language Netflix original programming
Lifetime (TV network) original programming
NBC original programming
Netflix original documentary television series
Spike (TV network) original programming
Television series by Disney–ABC Domestic Television
Television series featuring reenactments
Television shows set in the United States
True crime television series
Works about unsolved crimes